Mark Pacini is an American video game designer. He is a graduate of the Rochester Institute of Technology, and beginning in September 2008, works for Armature Studio. He previously worked for Retro Studios as game director of the critically acclaimed Metroid Prime series.

Works 
 NHL Breakaway 99 (1998) – project manager
 Turok: Rage Wars (1999) – project manager
 Metroid Prime (2002) – director
 Metroid Prime 2: Echoes (2004) – director
 Metroid Prime 3: Corruption (2007) – director
 Metroid Prime: Trilogy (2009) – special thanks
 Metal Gear Solid HD Collection (2012)
 PlayStation All-Stars Battle Royale (2012) – special thanks
 Batman: Arkham Origins Blackgate (2013) – director
 ReCore (2016) – director
 Resident Evil 4 VR (2021) – director

Past 
 Retro Studios (game director), January 2000 – April 2008
 Armature Studio (lead designer), September 2008 – present

References

External links 
 
 

Year of birth missing (living people)
Living people
Metroid
American video game designers